Lycae or Lykai was a town of ancient Lycia, located 60 stadia (11 km) from Kitanaura.

Its site is located on a hill near Ovacık, Asiatic Turkey. Ancient remains include a tower and sarcophagi.

References

Populated places in ancient Lycia
Former populated places in Turkey
Archaeological sites in Turkey